Henry Rono (born 12 February 1952, in Kapsabet) is a Kenyan retired track and field athlete who specialised in various long-distance running events. Although he never competed at the Olympics, Rono is remembered as one of the most prolific collegiate competitors in the history of track in the United States, as well as being the former record holder for the 3000 metres steeplechase for over a decade. Rono also set the world record for the 5000 metres twice, in 1978, then broke that record three years later.

Running career
Born in Nandi Hills, Kenya, into the Nandi tribe, Rono started running while at primary school. Starting in 1976, he attended college in the U.S. at Washington State University in Pullman, along with his compatriot Samson Kimobwa, who broke the 10,000 m world record in 1977. Rono was mentored on the Palouse by Cougar head coach John Chaplin. More Kenyan runners later enrolled at WSU, including Bernard Lagat, Mike Kosgei, and Patrick Muturi.

While at Washington State, Rono became only the third in history (after Gerry Lindgren and Steve Prefontaine) to win the NCAA Cross Country Championship three times,  in 1976, 1977, and 1979. His winning time of 28:07 in 1976, remains the fastest 10,000 m cross country time in NCAA history (in 2008 Galen Rupp ran 27:41 at the NCAA regional meet on a course that was said to be  short of the regular measure). He was also NCAA steeplechase champion in 1978 and 1979 and NCAA Indoor Champion in the 3000 m in 1977.

The peak of Rono's running career was the 1978 season. In a span of only 81 days, he broke four world records: 10,000 m (27:22.5), the 5000 m (13:08.4), the 3000 m steeplechase (8:05.4), and the 3000 m (7:32.1); an achievement unparalleled in the history of distance running. He lowered the 10,000 record by almost eight seconds, the 5000 by 4.5, the steeplechase by 2.6, and the 3000 by a full three seconds. That August, he also won the 5000 m and 3000 m steeplechase gold medals at the Commonwealth Games in Canada at Edmonton. Among his other performances was a steeplechase / 5000 m double in one day during qualifying at the NCAA championships at the University of Oregon at Eugene's Hayward Field. He set meet records in both events, turning in an 8:18 and 13:22. The former took six seconds off the NCAA meet record for the steeplechase. When he ran the steeplechase final the next day, he won in 8:12.39, taking another six seconds off the steeplechase mark. He won 10,000 m and 3000 m steeplechase gold medals in July at the All-Africa Games.

Although he was never quite as dominant as he was in 1978, Rono continued to run and compete at the same high level for the next four years, running the world's fastest 5000 meters of the year (13:19) and winning the NCAA cross country championships in 1979, running one of history's fastest 10,000 meters races in 1980 (27:31.68), having a strong year in the 5000 meters with several high quality races, including another 5,000 m world record (13:06.20) in 1981, and running history's third fastest 5000 meters (13:08.9) as well as twice running under 27:30 to come within seconds of his world record for 10,000 meters in 1982.

Rono never competed at the Olympics, as his country Kenya boycotted in 1976 and 1980; by 1984, he was no longer competing.

His 3000 m steeplechase world record (8:05.4) stood for eleven years, and, as of 2020, still stands as the collegiate record. His 10,000 meters world record remained the fastest time ever run by an NCAA athlete until Sam Chelanga's 27:08 in 2010 at the Payton Jordan invitational.

After turning 55 in February 2007, it was reported that Rono would attempt to break the world masters mile record for the 55–59 age group. 2007 was also the year Rono's autobiography, Olympic Dream, was published.

Rono currently coaches high school athletics in Albuquerque, New Mexico, and is pursuing a graduate degree in special education. He is also co-owner of Turbo Health Care Services Inc and Rhinow Corp.

Personal bests 
One mile – 3:59.2 indoors (1977)
3000 metres – 7:32.1 (1978)
5000 metres – 13:06.20 (1981)
10,000 metres – 27:22.47 (1978)
3000 metres steeplechase – 8:05.4 (1978)

Competition record

NCAA cross country

See also
 List of Washington State University people

References

External links

Henry Rono's Web Site: Team Rono
The EastAfrican, 6 May 2002: From The Good Life To Car-Washing, Henry Rono Tasted it All

1952 births
Living people
People from Nandi County
Kenyan male middle-distance runners
Kenyan male long-distance runners
Kenyan male steeplechase runners
Kenyan athletics coaches
Commonwealth Games gold medallists for Kenya
Commonwealth Games medallists in athletics
Athletes (track and field) at the 1978 Commonwealth Games
Washington State Cougars men's track and field athletes
African Games gold medalists for Kenya
African Games medalists in athletics (track and field)
Track & Field News Athlete of the Year winners
Athletes (track and field) at the 1978 All-Africa Games
Medallists at the 1978 Commonwealth Games